Over the Moon  may refer to:

Film
 Over the Moon (1939 film), a 1939 British comedy film
 Over the Moon (2020 film), a 2020 animated musical film

Music
 Over the Moon (Judie Tzuke album), 1997
 Over the Moon (Verlaines album), 1997 
 Over the Moon (Ginny Blackmore album), 2015
 "Over the Moon", a song by Cher Lloyd from her 2011 album Sticks + Stones
 "Over the Moon", a song by Steam Powered Giraffe from their 2015 album The Vice Quadrant: A Space Opera
 "Over the Moon", a song from the musical Rent